Franz Thannheimer (7 April 1904 – 27 June 1971) was a German ski jumper who competed in the 1928 Winter Olympics.

References

1904 births
1971 deaths
German male ski jumpers
Olympic ski jumpers of Germany
Ski jumpers at the 1928 Winter Olympics